Wu Ding; personal name Zi Zhao, was a king of the Shang dynasty who ruled China around 1200s BC. He is the earliest figure in Chinese history mentioned in contemporary records. The annals of the Shang dynasty compiled by later historians were once thought to be little more than legends until oracle script inscriptions on bones dating from his reign were unearthed at the ruins of his capital Yin (near modern Anyang) in 1899. Oracle bone inscriptions from his reign have been radiocarbon dated to 1254–1197 BC.

History

Dating 
Because Wu Ding is the earliest Chinese ruler whose reign is confirmed by contemporary material, dating his reign is a matter of significant historical interest.

According to the traditional chronology, he reigned from 1324–1266 BC. Cambridge History gives 1189 BC as the end date of his reign. The Xia–Shang–Zhou Chronology Project (2000), sponsored by the Chinese government, gives his reign as 1250–1192 BC. 
Inscriptions from twenty-six oracle bone divinations of his reign have been radiocarbon dated to 1254–1197 BC±10 years.

Early life 
According to later tradition, in the sixth year of his father's reign, he was ordered to live at He and study under Gan Pan. These early years spent among the common people allowed him to become familiar with their daily problems.

Documentation 
In the Records of the Grand Historian (Shiji) he was listed by Sima Qian as the twenty-second Shang king, succeeding his father Xiao Yi. The oracle bone script inscriptions unearthed at Yinxu alternatively record that he was the twenty-first Shang king. The Shiji says that he was enthroned in the dingwei year with Gan Pan as his prime minister and Yin as his capital.

He cultivated the allegiance of neighbouring tribes by marrying one woman from each of them. His favoured consort Fu Hao entered the royal household through such a marriage and served as military general and high priestess. Another of Wu Ding's wives, Fu Jing, was probably responsible for overseeing agricultural production, as this was the subject she divined about most frequently.

According to the Bamboo Annals, in the twenty-fifth year of his reign, his son Zu Ji died at a remote area after being exiled.

According to the Book of Documents, in the twenty-ninth year of his reign, he conducted rituals in honour of his ancestor Da Yi, the first king of the Shang dynasty, at the Royal Temple. Angered by the presence of a wild chicken standing on one of the ceremonial bronze vessels, he condemned his vassals and wrote a proclamation called "Day of the Supplementary Sacrifice of Gao Zong". The Book of Documents passage in question is attributed to Zu Ji, reflecting a different tradition of vital dates for that individual.

According to the Bamboo Annals, the thirty-second year of his reign, he sent troops to Guifang and after three years of fighting he conquered it. The Di and Qiang immediately sent envoys to Shang to negotiate. His armies went on to conquer Dapeng in the forty-third year of his reign, and Tunwei in the fiftieth year of his reign. Exactly how this is related to the campaigns in the oracle bone divinations is unclear, where the Gui Fang appears once, but the Gong Fang and Tu Fang campaigns have hundreds of divinations.

He died in the fifty-ninth year of his reign according to all the sources available, none of which are contemporary. Widely regarded in later tradition as one of the best kings of the Shang dynasty, he was given the posthumous name Wu Ding and was succeeded by his son Zu Geng.

References 

Shang dynasty kings
13th-century BC births
12th-century BC Chinese monarchs
13th-century BC Chinese monarchs